Ocean Grove are an Australian nu metal band formed in 2010. The band consists of vocalist Dale Tanner, drummer/producer Sam Bassal and bassist/vocalist Twiggy Hunter. Studio-only member Running Touch also provides synthesizers and additional production. 

As of 2022, the band has released three studio albums; The Rhapsody Tapes (2017), Flip Phone Fantasy (2020), and Up In The Air Forever (2022); along with two EP's; Outsider (2013) and Black Label (2015)

History

2010–2016: Formation and EPs

Ocean Grove were formed in 2010 in Melbourne, originally as a post-hardcore band by Luke Holmes (lead vocals), Dale Tanner (vocals/bass), Running Touch, Jimmy Hall (guitar) and Matias Morales (drums). This line-up released a demo in 2010, followed by their debut extended play, Outsider in 2013, before Morales departed the band later that year and was replaced by Sam Bassal. A single was released in late 2013 called "The Dead Years". In 2014, Running Touch stopped touring with the band to focus on his solo project, while remaining as a studio member and Matt Henley was brought in as their new live guitarist. On 12 June 2015, the band released their second extended play, Black Label, which peaked at No. 50 on the ARIA Albums Chart. It was followed by the Black Label Tour around Australia in July 2015 with support from Devastator and Void of Vision. The band was a supporting act, alongside Like Moths to Flames, Buried in Verona and August Burns Red for Northlane's headlining Australian tour in November 2015. In 2016, Ocean Grove supported both In Hearts Wake and Northlane on their "Equinox" dual-headlining tour.

2016–2018: The Rhapsody Tapes

On 27 April 2016, the band had signed with UNFD and released a new single, "Lights on Kind of Lover". The EP Black Label was released the United States and Europe under the revised title, Black Label (Sublime Vol.), with "Lights on Kind of Lover" included.

On 1 December 2016, Ocean Grove released a new single, "These Boys Light Fires". On 21 December they released another single, "Intimate Alien", along with its music video and announced that they would release their debut album, The Rhapsody Tapes, on 3 February 2017. Upon its release The Rhapsody Tapes reached No. 5 on the ARIA Albums Chart in its first week, and was selected as a "Feature Album" by Australian radio station, Triple J.

On 24 May 2017, Ocean Grove announced their national headlining tour, which spanned from 4 to 12 August with support from Justice for the Damned, Broken, and the Beverly Chills. The band then went on to support Northlane on their Mesmer World Tour across Europe and the United Kingdom, alongside Erra and Invent Animate, from 23 November to 16 December 2017. This was followed up directly by their first appearance in the USA, supporting August Burns Red on their 38-date 'The Phantom Anthem Tour', alongside Born of Osiris and Erra in January and February 2018.

Ocean Grove were one of the bands that performed at the first ever Download Festival Australia at Melbourne's Flemington Racecourse on 24 March 2018, as well as playing shows that same week in Sydney, Brisbane, and Adelaide supporting Limp Bizkit and Of Mice & Men.

2018–2021: Line-up changes and Flip Phone Fantasy

On 2 May 2018, Ocean Grove signed a worldwide publishing deal with BMG. In an interview with Depth magazine, Dale Tanner revealed that the band was working on material for a new album, then stating in a separate interview with Spotlight Report that a new single would come out later in the year with a new album possibly coming out in 2019.

On 14 December 2018, Ocean Grove released a new single "Glass Gloss", and announced that vocalist Luke Holmes and guitarist Jimmy Hall would be leaving the band and will be performing with the band for the last time at the Unify Gathering on 11 January 2019, with the band continuing on as a four-piece.

On 3 February 2019, the band released a teaser for their new member in the style of the Tony Hawk's Pro Skater character selection menu. On 4 February 2019, they premiered a new single, 'Ask for the Anthem' and announced the addition of Twiggy Hunter to the lineup as bassist and backing vocalist, with Dale Tanner moving to full-time frontman. On 1 October 2021, the band announced the departure of live guitarist Matt Henley.

2022: Up in the Air Forever
In January 2022, the group announced their third studio album, Up in the Air Forever will be released on 22 April 2022. The album is billed as a "10-track, genre-bending epic musical journey" and was proceeded by the singles "Cali Sun", "Silver Lining" and "Sex Dope Gold".

Style
Ocean Grove's musical style is generally considered as nu metal, grunge, nu metalcore and hardcore punk. The band themselves often describe their sound as "Odd World Music".

Band members

Current members
 Dale Tanner – lead vocals (2019–present), bass guitar, clean vocals (2010–2019)
 Sam Bassal – drums (2013–present), guitar (2021–present; studio only) 
 Twiggy Hunter – bass guitar, backing and lead vocals (2019–present)

Current touring musicians
 Andy Szetho – guitar (2022–present)

Studio members
 Matthew Kopp – samples, keyboards, vocals (2014–present; studio only), guitar (2010–2014; full time)

Former members
 Matthew Henley – guitar (2014–2021)
 Luke Holmes – lead vocals (2010–2019)
 James "Jimmy" Hall – guitar (2010–2019)
 Emile Battour – drums, vocals (2012-2013) 
 Matias Morales – drums (2010–2012)

Timeline

Discography

Albums

Extended plays

References

External links

Australian hard rock musical groups
Australian hardcore punk groups
Australian heavy metal musical groups
Australian nu metal musical groups
Australian alternative metal musical groups
Musical groups established in 2010
Victoria (Australia) musical groups
Musical groups from Melbourne